Keme Nzerem is a Nigerian British journalist who works for Channel 4 News as a news anchor and reporter. He joined the programme in 2001.

Education 
Nzerem studied geography as an undergraduate at the University of Sussex, and later received a postgraduate degree in broadcast journalism.

Career 
Before joining Channel 4 News, he worked as a writer for Comic Relief. He has worked as Channel 4's home affairs and Washington reporter, and as the sports producer, as well as co-presenting Channel 4 News, and presenting its sister programme More4 News. In 2002, he wrote about his experience of attending school with the shoe bomber, Richard Reid.

At the build-up of COP26 at Glasgow in 2021, Nzerem visited Nigeria to report stories for Channels 4 exclusive. The stories include a feature on the impact of climate change in Nigeria coastal communities, Nigeria looted Benin bronzes; and another for Nigeria LGBT community produced by Ashionye Ogene.

Awards and Recognitions   
In 2008, Nzerem received the  Royal Television Society foreign news award for a report on the American 2007 Iraq troop surge.

Background
He is Igbo. His father is a Nigerian and his mother is English.

See also
 List of Igbo people

References

British television journalists
ITN newsreaders and journalists
Living people
Year of birth missing (living people)